Feng Yazhu (born 19 December 1992) is a Chinese Paralympic swimmer. She represented China at the Summer Paralympics.

Career
Yazhu represented China at the 2012 Summer Paralympics in the 50 metre backstroke S2 event and won a gold medal. At the 2016 Summer Paralympics she won two silver medals in the 50 metre backstroke S2 and 100 metre backstroke S2 events. At the 2020 Summer Paralympics she won a bronze medal in the 50 metre backstroke S2 event.

References

1992 births
Living people
Paralympic swimmers of China
Chinese female backstroke swimmers
Swimmers from Tianjin
Swimmers at the 2012 Summer Paralympics
Swimmers at the 2016 Summer Paralympics
Swimmers at the 2020 Summer Paralympics
Medalists at the 2012 Summer Paralympics
Medalists at the 2016 Summer Paralympics
Medalists at the 2020 Summer Paralympics
Paralympic gold medalists for China
Paralympic silver medalists for China
Paralympic bronze medalists for China
Paralympic medalists in swimming
S2-classified Paralympic swimmers
21st-century Chinese women